Robert Groves (born 1948) is provost of Georgetown University and former director of the United States Census Bureau.

Robert Groves may also refer to:

Robert Groves Sandeman (1835–1892), colonial British Indian officer and administrator
Robert Marsland Groves (1880–1920), British air commodore
Robert Groves (artist) (born 1935), British artist

See also
Robert Grove (disambiguation)